René Le Hir, Reun an Hir in Breton, (1920–1999) was a Breton nationalist.

Breton nationalist
Le Hir was born in Plougastel, Finistère.  He participated in Skol Ober, correcting students' homework. He also taught Breton in Brest. He was county chair for the Parti National Breton in Landerneau.

Collaboration
During World War II, Le Hir was a member of the militia working with the Germans against the French Resistance. He was a member of the Kommando de Landerneau, "German group charged with the repression of all attempting to go against the surety of the army." He participated in the torture and the execution of many members of the Reisistance.

After war 
He was jailed for several years for his collaboration with the Nazis. After he was released, he lived in Africa where he worked as technician. He returned to France to work for a ferries company.

1920 births
1999 deaths
People from Finistère
Breton nationalists
Breton collaborators with Nazi Germany